The pic du Grand Quayrat is a French pyrenean summit, culminating at  in the vallée d'Oô (commune d'Oô near Bagnères-de-Luchon in the Haute-Garonne department, Midi-Pyrénées region).

Toponymy 
Its name in Occitan , meaning "square", comes from the distinctive shape of the summit, roughly forming a right angle, from the north.

History 
The Grand Quayrat became the second climbed three thousander in 1789, ascended by physician Henri Reboul, leading an expedition from the barnes of Astau.

References 

Mountains of the Pyrenees
Landforms of Haute-Garonne
Pyrenean three-thousanders